The trap was a shooting sports event held as part of the Shooting at the 1968 Summer Olympics programme. The competition was held on 18 and 19 October 1968 at the shooting ranges in Mexico City. 55 shooters from 34 nations competed. For the first time, the event was open to women as well as men (though none competed). Nations were limited to two shooters each. The event was won by Bob Braithwaite of Great Britain, the nation's first victory in the event and first medal of any color in the trap since 1908. Silver went to Thomas Garrigus of the United States. Kurt Czekalla of East Germany took bronze; it was the first medal in the event for East Germany as a separate nation, and the first medal for any German trap shooter since 1912.

Background

This was the 10th appearance of the men's ISSF Olympic trap event. The event was held at every Summer Olympics from 1896 to 1924 (except 1904, when no shooting events were held) and from 1952 to 2016; it was open to women from 1968 to 1996.

Eight of the top 10 shooters from the 1964 Games returned: gold medalist Ennio Mattarelli of Italy, silver medalist Pāvels Seničevs of the Soviet Union, fourth-place finisher Galliano Rossini of Italy, fifth-place finisher Ion Dumitrescu of Romania, sixth-place finisher Juan Enrique Lira of Chile, seventh-place finisher Bob Braithwaite of Great Britain, ninth-place finisher Josef Meixner of Austria, and tenth-place finisher Mohamed Mehrez of Egypt. Rossini was competing for the fifth time in the event, with a 1956 gold medal and a 1960 silver medal. Two of the three World Champions since the last Games competed: Lira (1965) and Guy Rénard of Belgium (1967); Seničevs had taken bronze in 1966.

The Browning shotgun was the most popular armament for the event.

Bolivia, the Dominican Republic, El Salvador, Ireland, Mexico, Thailand, Turkey, and Uruguay each made their debut in the event; East and West Germany competed separately for the first time. Great Britain made its 10th appearance, the only nation to have competed at each edition of the event to that point.

Competition format

The competition used the 200-target format introduced with the return of trap to the Olympics in 1952. Only a single round of shooting was done, with all shooters facing 200 targets. Shooting was done in 8 series of 25 targets. Shoot-offs of 25 targets each were shot as necessary to resolve ties for medals.

Records

Prior to this competition, the existing world and Olympic records were as follows. 

Bob Braithwaite of Great Britain tied the Olympic record at 198.

Schedule

Results

Braithwaite started his first series at 11 of 13, but then finished that series and each of the next seven perfectly (hitting 187 consecutive targets).

A three-way tie for second place at 196 points required a shoot-off. Defending silver medalist Seničevs hit 22 on the shoot-off, while Garrigus and Czekalla both were perfect. The latter two advanced to a second shoot-off. Czekalla missed the first target, enough to put Garrigus on top for silver when the American was perfect again; Czekalla finished the second shoot-off at 23 and a bronze medal.

References

Shooting at the 1968 Summer Olympics
Trap at the Olympics